Una radura is the second album by Gianna Nannini. It was released in 1977, and it features many guest musicians, including the Premiata Forneria Marconi.

Track listing
All songs by Gianna Nannini except as noted.

"Dialogo" - 3:23
"Rebecca" - 3:50
"Basta" - 3:08
"Frenesia" - 3:55
"Se" - 4:11
"Maria Paola" - 4:19
"Siamo Vivi" - 4:06
""Sono Stanco"" - 3:34
"Riprendo La Mia Faccia" (Gianna Nannini, Claudio Fabi) - 2:57
"Una Radura ..." - 3:23

Personnel 
Gianna Nannini - vocals, harmonica, keyboards, piano, guitar
Sergio Farina - guitar
Gigi Cappellotto - bass
Claudio Fabi - keyboards
Bob Callero - bass
Walter Calloni - drums
Ernesto Verardi - drums
Tullio De Piscopo - drums
Roberto Haliffi - percussion
Claudio Pascoli - sax
Greg Bloch - violin
Franco Mussida - guitar, vocals
Patrick Djivas - bass
Flavio Premoli - keyboards
Franz Di Cioccio - drums

External links
 Gianna Nannini homepage

1977 albums
Gianna Nannini albums